Karine Elharrar-Hartstein (born 9 October 1977) is an Israeli lawyer and politician who currently serves as Minister of National Infrastructures, Energy and Water Resources. She was previously a member of the Knesset for Yesh Atid from 2013 to 2021.

Biography
Elharrar was born in Kiryat Ono to Moti and Colette Elharrar, who were Moroccan Jewish immigrants. Elharrar attended Kugel High School, and studied law at the College of Management Academic Studies for a bachelor's degree, before gaining an LLM from the Washington College of Law at American University. Between 2008 and 2013 she headed the legal clinic at Bar-Ilan University, and specialised in the rights of Holocaust survivors, people with disabilities, and pensioners.

Elharrar lives in Rishon LeZion, and is married with two children. She has muscular dystrophy and uses a wheelchair.

Political career
She joined the new Yesh Atid party in 2012 and was placed tenth on the party's list for the 2013 Knesset elections. She entered the Knesset as the party won 19 seats. She was placed eighth on the party's list for the 2015 elections, and was re-elected as the party won 11 seats. She was re-elected in elections in April 2019, September 2019 and 2020, during which Yesh Atid was part of the Blue and White alliance.

After being re-elected again in the March 2021 elections, she was appointed Minister of National Infrastructures, Energy and Water Resources in the new government. In June she resigned from the Knesset under the Norwegian Law and was replaced by Inbar Bezek.

Elharrar made headlines during the COP26 conference in Glasgow, after she was forced to return to her hotel in Edinburgh due to the event not being wheelchair-accessible. She received an apology from British Prime Minister Boris Johnson, with the disability charity Scope calling the incident "inexcusable"; however, Elharrar said it was "a good experience to make sure the next UN conference will be accessible."

See also
Women of Israel

References

External links

1977 births
Living people
21st-century Israeli lawyers
21st-century Israeli women politicians
Members of the Knesset with disabilities
Israeli Jews
Israeli people of Moroccan-Jewish descent
Jewish Israeli politicians
Members of the 19th Knesset (2013–2015)
Members of the 20th Knesset (2015–2019)
Members of the 21st Knesset (2019)
Members of the 22nd Knesset (2019–2020)
Members of the 23rd Knesset (2020–2021)
Members of the 24th Knesset (2021–2022)
Members of the 25th Knesset (2022–)
People from Kiryat Ono
People with muscular dystrophy
Washington College of Law alumni
Ministers of Energy of Israel
Ministers of Infrastructure of Israel
Ministers of Water of Israel
Women members of the Knesset
Yesh Atid politicians
Government ministers with disabilities